Grupo Desportivo de Chaves, commonly known as Chaves, is a Portuguese football club from Chaves currently playing in the Primeira Liga. They were founded in 1949 and currently play at Estádio Municipal de Chaves. Their home kit is red-and-blue striped shirt with blue shorts and socks, and the away kit is all white. Their current president is Bruno Carvalho and their manager is Ricardo Soares. Chaves have been in the Portuguese First Division 13 times and had their best finish of fifth-place in the 1989–90 season. They went to Europe in the 1987–88 season, where they played in the UEFA Cup, beating Romanian side Universitatea Craiova in the first round and losing to Hungarian team Budapest Honvéd in the next round.

History
Grupo Desportivo de Chaves was founded on 27 September 1949 and is one of the most experienced teams in the Portuguese Second Division, not just because of its old culture, but also many years in the top-flight Primeira Liga, doing quite well and playing in European tournaments, such as the UEFA Cup. Their best ever finish was in the Primeira Liga when they finished fifth in both 1986–87 and 1989–90. In the 1986–87 season, meanwhile, they had fantastic results, beating Sporting Clube de Portugal 2–1 at home in a memorable night at the Estádio Municipal de Chaves. After those fantastic seasons, they finished sixth, seventh and ninth before getting relegated in the 1992–93 season to the Liga de Honra. They returned for another few seasons but then again suffered relegation to the Liga de Honra until 2007, where they eventually got relegated to the Portuguese Second Division: Série A. In the previous season of 2007–08, they finished in fourth place, just missing out on promotion.

After a series of great results in 2008–09 that granted the team the lead of Série A, Chaves finally achieved promotion to the second-flight Liga de Honra with an aggregate 1–0 win over Penafiel, the winner of the Portuguese Second Division: Série B in a semi-final playoff. In the playoff final, it was between Chaves and Fátima, in which both were guaranteed promotion to the Liga de Honra, with the final set to determine the champions. Fátima won the match 2–1. Chaves spent the following three years in the third division before being crowned Segunda Divisão champions in 2012–13, thus gaining promotion back to the Segunda Liga. After missing out on promotion to the first division during a thrilling final day of the 2014–15 season, Chaves were promoted the following season back to the top-flight Primeira Liga for the first time in 17 years.

Stadium
Estádio Municipal de Chaves is a multi-use stadium in Chaves. It is currently used mostly for football matches and is the home stadium of G.D. Chaves. The stadium is able to hold 12,000 people. The stadium normally holds the Portugal national team youth games and also some under-21 games, and also very rarely the senior team. This stadium is famous because it is where Cristiano Ronaldo made his senior international debut with Portugal.

Honours
Portuguese Second Division
 Champions (2): 2008–09, 2012–13
Taça de Portugal
Runners-up (1): 2009–10

Players

Current squad

Out on loan

Managerial history

Europe

League and cup history
The football section has 13 presences at the top level of Portuguese football. Its best position was two fifth-place finished, in the 1986–87 and 1989–90 seasons, the first earning Chaves its only presence in the European cups.

References

External links
 
 ZeroZero GD Chaves profile & stats 

 
Football clubs in Portugal
Association football clubs established in 1949
1949 establishments in Portugal
Primeira Liga clubs
Liga Portugal 2 clubs